The Audi A4 is a line of luxury compact executive cars produced since 1994 by the German car manufacturer Audi, a subsidiary of the Volkswagen Group. The A4 has been built in five generations and is based on the Volkswagen Group B platform. The first generation A4 succeeded the Audi 80. The automaker's internal numbering treats the A4 as a continuation of the Audi 80 lineage, with the initial A4 designated as the B5-series, followed by the B6, B7, B8, and the B9. The B8 and B9 versions of the A4 are built on the Volkswagen Group MLB platform shared with several models and brands across the Volkswagen Group. The Audi A4 automobile layout consists of a front-engine design, with transaxle-type transmissions mounted at the rear of the engine. The cars are front-wheel drive, or on some models, "quattro" all-wheel drive. The A4 is available as a sedan and station wagon. Historically, the second (B6) and third generations (B7) of the A4 also included a convertible version. For the fourth generation (B8) and onwards, the convertible, along with a new coupé and 5-door liftback variant, was spun-off by Audi into a new nameplate called the Audi A5.



B5 (Typ 8D; 1994)

The first generation Audi A4 (known internally as the Typ 8D) debuted in October 1994, with production starting November 1994 and European sales commencing in January 1995 for the 1995 model year. North American sales later began in September 1995 for the 1996 model year. It was built on the Volkswagen Group B5 (PL45) platform, which it shared with the fourth generation Volkswagen Passat (B5, Typ 3B). It had a front-mounted longitudinal engine and front-wheel drive. Many variations of the A4 were also available with Audi's quattro four-wheel drive system. The A4 was initially introduced as a four-door saloon/sedan; the Avant (estate/wagon) was introduced in November 1995 and went on sale in February 1996.

Development began in 1988, with the first design sketches being created later that year. By 1991, an exterior design by Imre Hasanic was chosen and frozen for November 1994 production by 1992. The interior design was later finalized in 1992, with pilot production commencing in the first half of 1994. Development concluded in the third quarter of 1994, preceding November 1994 start of production.

The 2.6 and 2.8-litre V6 engines which had been carried over from the old 80/90 proved popular, although in North America, the 2.8-litre engine was the only V6 that was available there until 1997. A 2.4-liter version was developed especially for the Thai market, where import duty jumped from 60 to 100 percent on cars of over 2,400 cc displacement.

The Audi A4 was the first model in the Volkswagen Group to feature the new 1.8-litre 20v engine with five valves per cylinder, based on the unit Audi Sport had developed for their Supertouring race car. A turbocharged 1.8T version produced  and  torque.

Audi also debuted their new tiptronic automatic transmission on the B5 platform, based on the unit Porsche developed for their 964-generation 911. The transmission is a conventional automatic gearbox with a torque converter offering the driver a fully-automatic operation or manual selection of the gear ratios.

The B5 marked Audi's continued move into the midsize luxury car segment, having started this trajectory notably with later model years of the preceding Audi 80/90 B4. Despite initial mechanical problems, overall build and assembly quality were lauded both by the automotive press and within Audi and Volkswagen, and at the time, parent company Volkswagen declared the B5 the company-wide build quality benchmark for all its other models.

Facelift (1999–2001)

The Audi A4 B5 saw nearly constant minor changes and alterations throughout its seven-year run. Moreover, a significant facelift was introduced for the 1998 B5 model year at the 1997 Frankfurt Motor Show, with sales beginning in Europe in early 1998. The 2.8-litre 30-valve V6 engine replaced the 2.8-litre 12-valve. A six-speed manual gearbox was available, as well as the new high-performance Audi S4, now part of the A4 lineup (the previous S4 had been an Audi 100). Cosmetic updates included new rear lights, headlights, door handles, and another minor exterior/interior changes.

The previous KKK K03 turbocharger, although fundamentally unchanged, received revisions on the turbine side to prevent cracking due to heat. The 12-valve V6 was replaced by the 30-valve unit which had been available in Europe for two years.

A further facelift took place across the A4 and S4 platform in February 1999 as a 1999.5 model; changes were largely cosmetic but affected many components, such as both front and rear bumpers, the front and rear lights, the center console, and door handles. This facelift was known at Audi as a Grosse Produktaufwertung (Major Product Upgrade), as was also signified by facelift cars now carrying the denomination "8D2".

In 1999 Audi also debuted an even higher performance RennSport model (rennsport literally translates as racing sport), the RS4 Avant, like its predecessor RS2, available only in the Avant bodystyle.

Engines
The following engines were available:

Safety
In the Euro NCAP safety and crash tests, the Audi B5 A4 received 3 stars for front- and side-impact protection, but the last star is flagged to indicate that the driver may be subjected to a high risk of chest injury in the side impact.
Adult occupant = 
Pedestrian =  (pre 2002 rating)

Derived hybrid version
In 1997, Audi was the first European car manufacturer to put a hybrid vehicle into mass production, the third generation Audi duo, then based on the A4 Avant.

B6 (Typ 8E/8H; 2000) 

The next A4, internally designated Typ 8E, debuted on 10 October 2000, now riding on the Volkswagen Group B6 (PL46) platform. The car's new styling was developed under Peter Schreyer between 1996 and 1998, inspired by the Bauhaus design language of the C5 (second-generation) Audi A6 introduced in 1997. The 1.6-litre base model powerplant remained unchanged, but most other petrol/gasoline engines received either displacement increases, or power upgrades. This generation of quattro consisted of default of 50:50 front to rear dynamic torque distribution. A Bosch ESP 5.7 Electronic Stability Programme (ESP) system, with anti-lock braking system (ABS), brake assist, and electronic brakeforce distribution (EBD) were standard across the range.

The Avant was introduced in June 2001 and arrived in European showrooms in September 2001.

A 2.0 engine with Fuel Stratified Injection (FSI) was also available. A year later, Audi reintroduced the S4, now powered by a  4.2 L V8 engine, as well as an A4 Cabriolet convertible variant (Typ 8H), finally replacing the 80-based Audi Cabriolet which had been discontinued in 2000. It included an electro-hydraulic operated roof, which lowered in under 30 seconds and incorporated some styling changes, such as body-coloured lower bumper and sill panels, which later found their way to the saloon version. The Audi A4 Cabriolet version was co-developed and manufactured by Karmann.

Audi introduced a continuously variable transmission developed by LuK, named multitronic, which replaced the dated conventional automatic transmission on front-wheel drive models. There have been widespread complaints from consumers around the world that the transmission box is prone to electronic glitches as well as mechanical problems.

Borrowing from the Audi A6, the boot was redesigned to remove the extension of the top edge with a smoother fold line. The rear light assemblies now formed part of the top line, these styling cues were eventually borrowed by other European as well as Asian manufacturers.

A sport package named 'Ultra Sport' was introduced in the North American market shortly before the B6 was replaced by the B7. It included aluminium interior trim and door sills, "S line" steering wheel, front and rear spoilers, side skirts, and quattro GmbH designed 18-inch RS4 alloy wheels.

Engines
The following engines were available:

Safety
The Audi A4 (B6 & B7) passed the Euro NCAP safety and crash tests, and was awarded the following car safety ratings:
Adult occupant = 
Pedestrian =  (pre 2002 rating)
The Insurance Institute for Highway Safety (IIHS) awarded both the B6 & B7 a "Good" rating in the frontal crash test; the B7 was not retested since the front portion is structurally the same.

 B7; (Typ 8E/8H; 2004)

Audi introduced a heavily facelifted A4 in late 2004, with the internal designation of B7. Although given a new platform designation, the B7 was essentially a heavily facelifted and revised version of the B6, with revised steering settings, suspension geometry, new internal combustion engine ranges, navigation systems and chassis electronics (including a new advanced Bosch ESP 8.0 Electronic Stability Programme (ESP) system). The front grille assembly changed to a tall trapezoidal shape in the same manner as the C6 (third-generation) Audi A6; however, the dashboard and interior were virtually unchanged from the B6 aside from minor detailing.

Audi's internal platform nomenclature uses PL46 (passenger car longitudinal platform, size 4, generation 6) for both B6 and B7 chassis. The Typ 8E and Typ 8H internal designations are also carried over from the B6 A4 range, but now have an additional identifying suffix – 8EC for the saloon, 8ED for the Avant, and 8HE for the Cabriolet.

The engine lineup received many additions. These engines both use a four-valve per cylinder configuration. The prior 5-valve design was incompatible with the FSI direct injection system (due to the siting of the fuel injector, now discharging directly into the combustion chamber). The 2.0 Turbocharged Direct Injection (TDI) diesel engine now combined Pumpe Düse (Unit Injector) (PD) technology with 16 valves, while the larger 2.5 TDI V6 diesel was superseded by a 3.0 V6 TDI, offering a  model during the year 2005 which was upgraded to a  model in 2006. A 2.7 V6 TDI was added later.

Torsen T-2 based quattro permanent four-wheel drive remained as an option on most A4 models. Audi retired its 5-speed manual transmissions in favour of a new Getrag 6-speed. As before, multitronic continuously variable transmission (CVT), now with selectable 'seven-speeds', was an option on front-wheel drive models, whilst a conventional ZF 6HP 6-speed tiptronic automatic transmission was an option on the quattro four-wheel drive models.

In addition to the Audi S4, which carried over the powertrain from the B6 S4 – Audi reintroduced the quattro GmbH developed Audi RS4 (RS for RennSport) to the lineup, for the first time on the saloon/sedan and Cabriolet body, and with a naturally aspirated, but high-revving 4.2-litre V8 FSI engine. Another inclusion on the RS4 was the latest generation Torsen T-3 Quattro 4WD system, which uses a 'default' asymmetric 40:60 front-rear dynamic torque distribution bias. This new asymmetric center differential was initially only available on the RS4 but was added a year later on the S4. The remainder of the B7 A4 range still used the T-2 50:50 default dynamic split center diff.

A variant, developed by quattro GmbH, was first introduced in May 2005, named "Audi A4 DTM Edition". It was inspired by Audi's race cars of the 2004 Deutsche Tourenwagen Masters and was reintroduced in 2006 as a regular option. It was available with front-wheel drive, or Quattro four-wheel drive.

The B7 Cabriolet model arrived later than the other two body variants, being first shown in late 2005 and with sales beginning in February 2006. New on the Cabriolet was an entry-level 2.0 TDI version, which was not offered with the Multitronic CVT gearbox. The Cabriolet version was produced by Karmann until February 2009.

In 2007 Audi introduced a version of the B7 named the 'Special Edition', which built on the S-Line specification and also included the black optics pack, the RS4 style 8J X 18 '7-arm double-spoke' design alloy wheels, Two-tone Graphite/Black Volterra leather, 3-spoke sports leather/Alcantara multi-function steering wheel with gear knob and hand brake handle in Alcantara with silver stitching, ventilated cross-drilled front disc-brakes, black tailpipes and black roof rails (Avant model only). It also had a power increase of 20 PS, giving an output of 220 PS on the 2.0T model.

According to 2007 Swedish vehicle inspection data, the Audi A4 Avant with diesel engine is the most reliable vehicle available on the market, with vehicle inspection rejection rate of 0.0% in three-year-old category.

SEAT Exeo 

When the successor B8 A4 range was introduced, the B7 series A4 was restyled and rebadged as the SEAT Exeo in 2008 with changes to the front and rear plus interior trim from the A4 Cabriolet. The entire Audi B7 A4 production line from Audi's Ingolstadt plant was dismantled and sent to Volkswagen Group's SEAT factory in Martorell, Spain.

Engines
The following engines were available:

Safety
The Audi A4 offers many standard safety features, including Bosch ESP 8.0 Electronic Stability Programme (ESP) with anti-lock braking system (ABS), side airbags in the seats, 'sideguard' curtain airbags, and its optional quattro four-wheel drive system. It also received the Insurance Institute for Highway Safety (IIHS) "Top Safety Pick For 2007". EuroNCAP crash test results from the B6 apply to the B7 model.

B8 (Typ 8K; 2008)

Audi released the first official pictures of the B8 series A4 in August 2007 and unveiled the car to the public at the September 2007 Frankfurt Motor Show. Saloon/sedan and Avant (estate/wagon) models are offered. The Avant was unveiled to the public at the March 2008 Geneva Motor Show. For North America's destined models, the B8 continued in production for the 2016 model year, while Europe began deliveries on the 2016 B9 model.

The B8 A4 is built on a variant of the Audi Modular Longitudinal Platform, a platform that is also used in the Audi A5 coupé. While prior A4 chassis were limited in wheelbase due to the relationship between the engine, transmission and front axle, the MLP allows for a reduced front overhang, resulting in a greater wheelbase length without the same increase in overall length. This effectively redistributes the centre of gravity slightly rearwards, improving handling by better balancing vehicle mass between the front and rear axles. The estimated static front:rear weight ratio of the B8 A4 is approximately 55:45, depending on body style and engine. The relocation of the steering rack in front of the axle also improves handling over previous A4 platforms. Key to the implementation of MLB is the novel mounting of the differential in front of the clutch. This is achieved by driving the flywheel/clutch remotely by means of a 'top hat' shaped drive plate, between which the differential lay shaft passes, whilst power transmission to the final drive is via an inclined transfer shaft which runs the length of the transmission unit. Whilst the platform retains Audi's "overhung" engine mounting position, the front axle is now 152mm further forward than the previous B6/B7 generation platform. The transfer shaft, however, has the effect of creating a large "bulge" on one side of the transmission tunnel, which on right-hand drive versions forces the pedals to be badly offset, which has attracted criticism from the British motoring press in particular.

Although the overall dimensions have increased, the curb weight has dropped some 10%.

Reception has been mixed, with praise for the Audi A4's increased size, giving it best-in-class rear legroom and trunk space in the compact executive car segment. Its inline-4 2.0 TFSI engine, while efficient providing plenty of torque, was considered lacking and less refined compared to 6-cylinder engines of lighter rivals who posted faster acceleration times. However, the Audi S4 sports sedan has been well-received for its V6 3.0 TFSI engine's power and efficiency.

The B8 A4 was facelifted in early 2012.

During a model, cycle changes are made to integrate new technologies and to keep the model competitive. These changes are referenced based on the model year (MY) of the car.
In Australia, the B8 has undergone 2 revisions leading to three variants, the B8, B8 MY10 and B8 MY11.

Body types

Saloon / Sedan 
Audi released the first official pictures of the B8 series A4 in August 2007 and unveiled the car to the public at the September 2007 Frankfurt Motor Show. Saloon/sedan and Avant (estate/wagon) models are offered.

Avant
The Avant station wagon/estate was presented at the March 2008 Geneva Motor Show.

A4L
The A4L is a long-wheelbase version for the Chinese market, with a  longer wheelbase and length. The vehicle was presented at the 2008 Guangzhou Motor Show. The production version then went on sale in January 2009.

A4 allroad quattro
The A4 Allroad Quattro features a wider track, increased ground clearance, Quattro permanent four-wheel drive, a distinctive radiator grille, stainless steel underbody guards and roof rails.

The A4 allroad quattro was made available in early summer 2009.
The car was unveiled in 2009 Geneva Motor Show.

Specifications

Body styles

The A4-based convertible models were replaced by the A5/S5 Cabriolet.

Engines
The B8 powertrain options are the following: engines, transmissions and drivelines: (All United Kingdom specification unless stated otherwise). (for South Africa specification). (for Australia specification). (for New Zealand specification).

The quattro permanent four-wheel drive system uses the latest Torsen T-3 centre differential, with a default 40:60 front to rear asymmetric torque distribution ratio (used first on the B7 RS4) as standard. (Previous A4 Quattro models split torque with a default front:rear 50:50). The additional torque bias applied to the rear wheels helps mimic the driving dynamics of rear-wheel drive cars.

Audi was reported to stop offering 3.2L V6 models in 2010 model year, but still offers them as of August 2011 (Germany).

All petrol engines use Fuel Stratified Injection (FSI), and all diesel engines use the common rail fuel delivery (with a pressure of ), with piezo injectors of their Turbocharged Direct Injection engines.

With the 2012 facelift (the B8.5) came additional 163ps TDIe and TDI Ultra engines, the latter requiring the addition of adblue allowing for cleaner running, both of which fell into the lower emissions tax bracket for the UK, yet presenting a significant performance improvement over the base 136ps and mid-range 143ps models.

Transmissions
In 2009, Audi announced the seven-speed S-Tronic dual-clutch automatic transmission as an option for A4 in the UK and European markets.

All A4L models include Speed 8 multitronic continuously variable/manual transmission, except for A4L 3.2 FSI quattro, which includes Tiptronic automatic transmission.

Volkswagen settled a class-action lawsuit in 2013 involving the failures of the CVT transmission in its Audi A4 and A6 automobiles for model years 2002–2006.

Performance

Equipment

Standard equipment on the B8 A4 includes:
LED daytime running lights (on some models);
MMI system (Multi Media Interface) (multi-mode interface of driver information and entertainment systems); (3rd generation MMI expected in vehicles produced from week 22 of 2009). Standard system (Audi Concert/Symphony models) does not include navigation or Bluetooth connectivity (or Bluetooth audio streaming - applicable to 2012 facelift onwards, B8.5 models)
Electronic hand brake
Speed sensitive power steering ('servotronic' – on some models)

Options:
Audi Lane Assist (lane departure warning system);
Audi Side Assist (blind spot monitor);
Adaptive Cruise Control (ACC);
Advanced Key (keyless entry and start);
Bang & Olufsen 14 speaker sound system (505W);
Advanced parking system front and rear with reversing camera;
Navigation system with full MMI with  screen;
Adaptive headlights (with cornering technology);
Audi Drive Select;

Safety

Euro NCAP
The Audi A4 (B8) Euro NCAP crash tests ratings (pre-2009 testing):
 Adult occupant = 
 Child occupant = 
 Pedestrian = 

Euro NCAP (2009 testing):
 Overall = 
 Adult occupant = 93%
 Child occupant = 84%
 Pedestrian = 39%

Insurance Institute for Highway Safety (IIHS)

Head and seat restraints
Good

NHTSA

A4 TDI concept e (2008)
It can achieve a fuel consumption of 3.99L/100 km (58.95 mpg) and CO2 output of 105 g/km.

Other features include electric motor-based power steering, revised aerodynamics, low-rolling-resistance 225/45R17 tires, and electric actuation of the rear brakes.

The car was unveiled in Paris Motor Show.

Facelift (2012–2015)

The facelift model Audi A4 came in 2011. It features redesigned LED headlamps and taillights, front air dam with fog lamps, and closely set twin exhausts. Interior changes include Bluetooth connectivity for audio streaming (nav equipped models only) and a redesigned ignition key. Controls for air-conditioning, infotainment, and power windows gain chrome clasps. Other detail interior changes include larger steering column stalk switches first seen in the D4-series Audi A8 and a simplified layout for the HVAC control panel – for example the temperature setting for the heated seats is now directly set by a single button and is no longer controlled using the MMI dial. The A4 includes a radio with eight speakers as standard, while the MMI navigation system with voice dialogue is optional. A new "Drive Select System" allows drivers to choose comfort, dynamic, individual, or efficiency modes for fuel-efficiency. The power output of the 1.8 TFSI engine is 170 BHP and 320 Nm of torque – up 10 BHP and 70 Nm from the previous versions. Electromechanical power steering is standard.

In Europe, the wide range of Audi A4 saloon and Avant estate are available with the 1.8 TFSI, 2.0 TFSI gasoline engine, as well as 2.0 TDI, 2.0 TDIe, and 3.0 TDI diesel motor. Trim levels are Attraction, Ambition, and Ambiente. In the UK, the A4 range is offered in SE, SE Technik, Technik, S line, and Black Edition model grades. All-wheel-drive Quattro is offered in most engine and grade combinations.

For North America, the facelift model Audi A4 sedan is only offered with a 2.0 TFSI gasoline engine. Model grades are Premium, Premium Plus, and Prestige. The Avant was discontinued, leaving the Allroad Quattro as the only station wagon body style. For the 2016 model year, the A4 and S4 continued in B8 production. The B9 A4 would not reach the North American market until the 2017 model year, while the S4 variant would not be available until the 2018 model year.

B9 (Typ 8W; 2016)

The fifth-generation of the A4 was revealed in June 2015 when pre-production versions were released to the motoring press, with the official launch occurring at the Frankfurt Motor Show in September 2015. This generation of the A4 is the fifth to carry the A4 badge and is commonly referred to as the B9, representing the ninth generation of the Audi 80/A4 series, which were originally (but no longer) based on the B platform. The B9 is slightly larger than the outgoing B8, but Audi claims the new A4 is around  lighter than its predecessor.

Engines

Seven engines are available from launch, three petrol, and four diesel. All are available in both the A4 Saloon and A4 Avant. The figures below are for the saloon only.

Motorsport

A4 DTM

Audi Sport re-entered the Deutsche Tourenwagen Masters (DTM) series in 2004 (after having privateer teams run the Abt Sportsline Audi TT-R) with a V8 engined silhouette racing car resembling the A4 saloon, known as the Audi A4 DTM. A4 DTM cars are identified by Audi Sport "R"-prefix designations.

Australian Super Touring Championship
Brad Jones won the Australian Super Touring Championship in both 1996 and 1998 driving an A4.

BTCC

The A4 was used in the 1996–1998 and 2011-2015 British Touring Car Championship seasons.

ETCC
The A4 was used in the 2000–2001 European Super Touring Championship season.

Italian touring cars
A4 drivers won the Italian Superturismo Championship in 1995 and 1996.

STCC
Drivers in an A4 won 2001, 2002, 2003, and the 2006 Swedish Touring Car Championship season.

STW
The A4 was entered into the 1995 Super Tourenwagen Cup season.

RTCC
The car was used in the 2006 Russian Touring Car Championship.

SCCA
The A4 was used in the SCCA World Challenge for several years.

Renaming
In March 2023, Audi CEO  confirmed that the A4 would be renamed the A5, while the A6 would become the A7, with the future A4 and A6 to be sold as electric vehicles only.

See also
 Volkswagen Group China

References

Notes

Bibliography

External links

A4
Compact executive cars
Euro NCAP large family cars
Sedans
Station wagons
Convertibles
Vehicles with CVT transmission
All-wheel-drive vehicles
Front-wheel-drive vehicles
Cars introduced in 1994

2000s cars
2010s cars
2020s cars
Hybrid electric cars
Touring cars